Vitor Carvalho Vieira (born 27 May 1997), commonly known as Vitor Carvalho, is a Brazilian professional footballer who plays as a midfielder for Gil Vicente.

Career
Vitor Carvalho came through the youth ranks at Coritiba. He made senior debut for the club as a substitute on 11 December 2016, the last game of the 2016 Campeonato Brasileiro Série A against Ponte Preta, when Coritiba had already released a number of first team players.

Career statistics

References

External links

1997 births
Living people
Brazilian footballers
Association football midfielders
Coritiba Foot Ball Club players
Gil Vicente F.C. players
Campeonato Brasileiro Série B players
Primeira Liga players
Brazilian expatriate footballers
Expatriate footballers in Portugal
Sportspeople from Tocantins